Colasposoma aeneoviolaceum is a species of leaf beetle of the Democratic Republic of the Congo. It was first described by the Belgian entomologist  in 1941.

Description
Adults measure between 7 and 10 mm in length. They have a shiny bronze-coloured dorsum, while the edges of the pronotum, the underparts and the feet are violet in colour. However, one specimen from Moliro was found with a blue underside. The species generally resembles Colasposoma overlaeti.

Subspecies
There are two subspecies of C. aeneoviolaceum:

 Colasposoma aeneoviolaceum aeneoviolaceum Burgeon, 1941: the nominotypical subspecies
 Colasposoma aeneoviolaceum elisabethae Burgeon, 1941: Compared to the nominal form, the adults differ in their bronze colouring, have a cupreous or tanned underside, and have less abundant elytral punctuation. The subspecies was described from Élisabethville (now Lubumbashi), in the south of Katanga.

References

aeneoviolaceum
Beetles of the Democratic Republic of the Congo
Endemic fauna of the Democratic Republic of the Congo
Beetles described in 1941